NF-kappa-B-repressing factor is a protein that in humans is encoded by the NKRF gene.

This gene encodes a transcription factor that interacts with specific negative regulatory elements (NREs) to mediate transcriptional repression of certain NK-kappa-B-responsive genes. 

The protein localizes predominantly to the nucleolus with a small fraction found in the nucleoplasm and cytoplasm.

References

Further reading